The following elections occurred in 1896:

North America

Canada
 1896 Canadian federal election
 December 1896 Edmonton municipal election
 January 1896 Edmonton municipal election
 1896 Manitoba general election

United States
 Bourbon Democrat
 1896 New York state election
 1896 South Carolina gubernatorial election
 1896 United States House of Representatives elections
 United States House of Representatives elections in California, 1896
 United States House of Representatives elections in South Carolina, 1896
 1896 United States presidential election
 United States Senate election in South Carolina, 1896
 1896 United States Senate elections

Australia
 1896 South Australian colonial election

New Zealand
 1896 New Zealand general election
 1896 City of Christchurch by-election

Chile
 1896 Chilean presidential election

See also
 :Category:1896 elections

1896
Elections